The Joykiller was an American punk rock supergroup from Huntington Beach, California, United States. The Joykiller were formed in 1995 by Jack Grisham of T.S.O.L., Billy Persons (The Weirdos/Gun Club) and Ronnie King. After the formation of the band Jack recruited his ex-T.S.O.L. bandmate Ron Emory on guitar and added Chris Lagerborg on drums. This original line-up recorded one album on Epitaph Records, The Joykiller, before Emory was replaced in 1996.

The next line-up saw the addition of songwriter Sean Greaves on guitar. They recorded two albums on the Epitaph label, Static and Three, and toured the U.S., Canada, and Europe.

The Joykiller released their fifth record, Music for Break-Ups, in January 2015.

Discography

Albums 
The Joykiller (1995) on Epitaph Records
Static (1996) on Epitaph Records
Three (1997) on Epitaph Records
Ready Sexed Go! (2003) on Epitaph Records
Music for Break-Ups (2015) Self Released via Kickstarter

Related bands 
Down by Law - Chris Lagerborg
F-Minus,  - Chris Lagerborg
Floorlords - Sean Greaves
Gun Club - Billy Persons
T.S.O.L. - Jack Grisham
Tender Fury - Jack Grisham
The Weirdos - Billy Persons

External links 
Official website
The Joykiller Official MySpace
Artist Direct profile
Punk news profile
The Joykiller interview
The Joykiller - BandToBand.com

Punk rock groups from California
Musical groups from Orange County, California